Carex multicostata is a species of sedge known by the common name manyrib sedge.

Distribution
This sedge is native to the western United States from California to Montana, where it grows mainly in dry areas in mountain ranges, such as the Sierra Nevada and Transverse Ranges.

Description
Carex multicostata produces a dense clump of stems up to about a meter in maximum height. The inflorescence is roughly triangular in shape and brown or gold in color, a dense cluster of overlapping spikes. The female flower has a covering bract which is reddish with white edges.

External links
Jepson Manual Treatment - Carex multicostata
Flora of North America
Carex multicostata - Photo gallery

multicostata
Flora of the Sierra Nevada (United States)
Flora of California
Flora of the Northwestern United States
Flora of Nevada
Flora of Utah
Plants described in 1917
Flora without expected TNC conservation status